Jungle Cry is an Indian Hindi language sports drama film directed by Sagar Ballary. The film stars Abhay Deol, Emily Shah and Atul Kumar in the lead role. The movie was released on the 3rd of June 2022 on Lionsgate Play.

Cast
 Abhay Deol
 Emily Shah
 Atul Kumar
 Joynal

References

External links
 

2022 drama films
2022 films
2020s Hindi-language films
Indian sports drama films